Depew is a town in Creek County, Oklahoma, United States. It is 41 miles southwest of Tulsa. The population was 476 at the 2010 census, a decline of 15.6 percent from the figure of 564 recorded in 2000. The town was named in honor of New York Senator Chauncey Depew.

History
Depew began as a settlement named Hall in 1898, when the St. Louis and Oklahoma City Railroad (later merged into the St. Louis and San Francisco Railway) built a line between Sapulpa and Oklahoma City. In 1901, Walter F. Malley named the community, gave it the present name and opened a post office.

Geography
Depew is located at  (35.801403, -96.506641). It is approximately 29 miles southwest of Sapulpa

Demographics

As of the census of 2000, there were 564 people, 213 households, and 145 families residing in the town. The population density was 1,423.4 people per square mile (544.4/km2). There were 240 housing units at an average density of 605.7 per square mile (231.7/km2). The racial makeup of the town was 74.47% White, 8.69% African American, 9.57% Native American, and 7.27% from two or more races. Hispanic or Latino of any race were 1.42% of the population.

There were 213 households, out of which 38.0% had children under the age of 18 living with them, 50.2% were married couples living together, 13.1% had a female householder with no husband present, and 31.5% were non-families. 29.6% of all households were made up of individuals, and 15.0% had someone living alone who was 65 years of age or older. The average household size was 2.65 and the average family size was 3.32.

In the town, the population was spread out, with 31.0% under the age of 18, 9.2% from 18 to 24, 27.3% from 25 to 44, 18.1% from 45 to 64, and 14.4% who were 65 years of age or older. The median age was 33 years. For every 100 females there were 88.0 males. For every 100 females age 18 and over, there were 86.1 males.

The median income for a household in the town was $25,536, and the median income for a family was $29,250. Males had a median income of $23,438 versus $18,542 for females. The per capita income for the town was $10,868. About 19.2% of families and 22.4% of the population were below the poverty line, including 30.5% of those under age 18 and 16.7% of those age 65 or over.

The NAACP labeled this town a reactionary town due to its significant involvement in and opposition to the Civil Rights Movement. Dr. Martin Luther King Junior set up what he called "freedom schools" in Depew to educate local blacks on how to peacefully gain their right to vote in Creek County. Thus the black community in Depew is rather strong compared to most of the surrounding towns.

Notable person
Wayne Cooper (artist), (b. 1942) Western painter and sculptor

See also

 List of municipalities in Oklahoma

References

External links

 Encyclopedia of Oklahoma History and Culture - Depew

1898 establishments in Indian Territory
Towns in Creek County, Oklahoma
Populated places established in 1898